Recursive least squares (RLS) is an adaptive filter algorithm that recursively finds the coefficients that minimize a weighted linear least squares cost function relating to the input signals. This approach is in contrast to other algorithms such as the least mean squares (LMS) that aim to reduce the mean square error. In the derivation of the RLS, the input signals are considered deterministic, while for the LMS and similar algorithms they are considered stochastic. Compared to most of its competitors, the RLS exhibits extremely fast convergence. However, this benefit comes at the cost of high computational complexity.

Motivation
RLS was discovered by Gauss but lay unused or ignored until 1950 when Plackett rediscovered the original work of Gauss from 1821.  In general, the RLS can be used to solve any problem that can be solved by adaptive filters. For example, suppose that a signal  is transmitted over an echoey, noisy channel that causes it to be received as

where  represents additive noise.  The intent of the RLS filter is to recover the desired signal  by use of a -tap FIR filter, :

The estimate of the recovered desired signal is

The estimate is "good" if   is small in magnitude in some least squares sense.  

The benefit of the RLS algorithm is that there is no need to invert matrices, thereby saving computational cost.  Another advantage is that it provides intuition behind such results as the Kalman filter.

Discussion
The idea behind RLS filters is to minimize a cost function  by appropriately selecting the filter coefficients , updating the filter as new data arrives. The error signal  and desired signal  are defined in the negative feedback diagram below:

The error implicitly depends on the filter coefficients through the estimate :

where  is the "forgetting factor" which gives exponentially less weight to older error samples.

The cost function is minimized by taking the partial derivatives for all entries  of the coefficient vector  and setting the results to zero

Next, replace  with the definition of the error signal

Rearranging the equation yields

This form can be expressed in terms of matrices

Based on this expression we find the coefficients which minimize the cost function as

This is the main result of the discussion.

Choosing λ
The smaller  is, the smaller is the contribution of previous samples to the covariance matrix. This makes the filter more sensitive to recent samples, which means more fluctuations in the filter co-efficients. The  case is referred to as the growing window RLS algorithm. In practice,  is usually chosen between 0.98 and 1. By using type-II maximum likelihood estimation the optimal  can be estimated from a set of data.

Recursive algorithm
The discussion resulted in a single equation to determine a coefficient vector which minimizes the cost function. In this section we want to derive a recursive solution of the form

where  is a correction factor at time . We start the derivation of the recursive algorithm by expressing the cross covariance  in terms of 
{|
|-
|
|
|-
|
|
|-
|
|
|}
where  is the  dimensional data vector

{|
|-
|
|
|-
|
|
|}
In order to generate the coefficient vector we are interested in the inverse of the deterministic auto-covariance matrix. For that task the Woodbury matrix identity comes in handy. With
{|
|-
|
| is -by-
|-
|
| is -by-1 (column vector)
|-
|
| is 1-by- (row vector)
|-
|
| is the 1-by-1 identity matrix
|}
The Woodbury matrix identity follows
{|
|-
|
|
|
|-
|
|
|
|-
|
|
|
|-
|
|
|
|}
To come in line with the standard literature, we define
{|
|-
|
|
|-
|
|
|}
where the gain vector  is
{|
|-
|
|
|-
|
|
|}
Before we move on, it is necessary to bring  into another form
{|
|-
|
|
|-
|
|
|}
Subtracting the second term on the left side yields
{|
|-
|
|
|-
|
|
|}
With the recursive definition of  the desired form follows

Now we are ready to complete the recursion. As discussed
{|
|-
|
|
|-
|
|
|}
{|
|-
|
|
|-
|
|
|-
|
|
|}
With  we arrive at the update equation
{|
|-
|
|
|-
|
|
|}
where 
is the a priori error. Compare this with the a posteriori error; the error calculated after the filter is updated:

That means we found the correction factor

This intuitively satisfying result indicates that the correction factor is directly proportional to both the error and the gain vector, which controls how much sensitivity is desired, through the weighting factor, .

RLS algorithm summary
The RLS algorithm for a p-th order RLS filter can be summarized as

The recursion for  follows an algebraic Riccati equation and thus draws parallels to the Kalman filter.

Lattice recursive least squares filter (LRLS)
The lattice recursive least squares adaptive filter is related to the standard RLS except that it requires fewer arithmetic operations (order N). It offers additional advantages over conventional LMS algorithms such as faster convergence rates, modular structure, and insensitivity to variations in eigenvalue spread of the input correlation matrix. The LRLS algorithm described is based on a posteriori errors and includes the normalized form. In the forward prediction case, we have  with the input signal  as the most up to date sample.

Parameter summary
 is the forward reflection coefficient

 is the backward reflection coefficient

 represents the instantaneous a posteriori forward prediction error

 represents the instantaneous a posteriori backward prediction error

 is the minimum least-squares backward prediction error

 is the minimum least-squares forward prediction error

 is a conversion factor between a priori and a posteriori errors

 are the feedforward multiplier coefficients.

 is a small positive constant that can be 0.01

LRLS algorithm summary
The algorithm for a LRLS filter can be summarized as

Normalized lattice recursive least squares filter (NLRLS)
The normalized form of the LRLS has fewer recursions and variables. It can be calculated by applying a normalization to the internal variables of the algorithm which will keep their magnitude bounded by one. This is generally not used in real-time applications because of the number of division and square-root operations which comes with a high computational load.

NLRLS algorithm summary
The algorithm for a NLRLS filter can be summarized as

See also
Adaptive filter
Kernel adaptive filter
Least mean squares filter
Zero-forcing equalizer

References
 
 Simon Haykin, Adaptive Filter Theory, Prentice Hall, 2002, 
 M.H.A Davis, R.B. Vinter, Stochastic Modelling and Control, Springer, 1985, 
 Weifeng Liu, Jose Principe and Simon Haykin, Kernel Adaptive Filtering: A Comprehensive Introduction, John Wiley, 2010, 
 R.L.Plackett, Some Theorems in Least Squares, Biometrika, 1950, 37, 149–157, 
 C.F.Gauss, Theoria combinationis observationum erroribus minimis obnoxiae, 1821, Werke, 4. Gottinge

Notes

Digital signal processing
Filter theory
Statistical signal processing